Evans Starzinger and Beth Leonard are among the leading blue water cruising sailors today.
   
During the 1990s they completed a circumnavigation aboard a Shannon 37' ketch, using the typical tropical route but including Cape Hope.  During the 2000s they have taken a custom built Van De Stadt designed 47' aluminum fractional sloop on a second circumnavigation, above the Arctic Circle and around all five great capes - Cape Horn, Cape of Good Hope, Cape Leeuwin, South West Cape, Tasmania, and South West Cape, New Zealand. This included a 9,000-mile, 59-day, non-stop leg sailing east in the Southern Ocean from Puerto Williams to Fremantle. In 2007 they completed a second 65,000-mile circumnavigation, east about, under all the great capes and above the Arctic Circle. In 2008 they cruised around Patagonia, the Falkland Islands and South Georgia, and then up the Atlantic in 2009 to St Helena, the Caribbean and back to Chesapeake Bay to return to the same slip from which they started the voyage on Hawk. Since the completion of these two circumnavigations they have been back and forth to Newfoundland and Nova Scotia several times.

Beth and Evans have won a number of noteworthy awards for their cruising.  These include:

The 2003 Vasey Vase by the Ocean Cruising club for 9,000 miles/59-day non-stop passage in the Southern Ocean and the 2009 Vasey Vase for their 2008 cruise to South Georgia
The Far Horizons Medal by the Cruising Club of America for their voyages
The Seven Seas Award, which signifies the highest international recognition to a cruising sailor whose experiences on the sea demonstrate a deep commitment to good seamanship and an understanding of his ship and environment. In the 57 years of SSCA's existence, this honor has only been awarded sixteen times.
Beth's book Blue Horizons has won the Outdoor Literature category of the 2007 National Outdoor Book Awards. It is the first time a sailing book has won the Literature prize. The announcement is on the NOBA website.

Previous to their first voyage they both worked for McKinsey & Company, a leading corporate strategy consulting firm. In between the two voyages, Evans Starzinger was a vice president at General Electric running an IT business unit and Beth wrote three books (The Voyager's Handbook, Blue Horizons and Following Seas). Most recently Evans has been CEO of two start-ups (North Thin Ply Technology & Augmented reality Labs) and the Offshore Safety Regulations advisor on two US sailing accident investigation panels. Beth is editor of Seaworthy magazine and director of Technical Services at BoatUS.

Bibliography
Books
Voyagers Handbook 
Following Seas 
Blue Horizons

References 
 Evans Starzinger & Beth Leonard's website
 NOBA Prize
 Becoming a writer
 Cruising World Profile

External links 
 Cruising Club of America
 Ocean Cruising Club, focused on helping Blue Water cruisers
 Seven Seas Cruising Association
 Royal Cruising Club, ocean and coastal navigational guidance with links
 The Voyager's Handbook: The Essential Guide to Blue Water Cruising
 Following Seas: A Voyage of Discovery

Living people
Year of birth missing (living people)
Place of birth missing (living people)
Circumnavigators of the globe
American sailors